Gregory James McFadden (born 28 August 1964 in Sydney) is an Australian water polo player.  He represented Australia as a member of the 1992 Summer Olympics Australia men's national water polo team. He was head coach of the Australia women's national water polo team from 2005 to 2016.

Personal
McFadden was born on 28 August 1964 in Sydney. He is nicknamed Dumper.

Player
McFadden played club water polo for the Cronulla Sutherland Water Polo Club.  He later was a coach for the several different grades in the club.

McFadden had a water polo scholarship at the Australian Institute of Sport (AIS) for two years where he was coached by Charles Turner. He was a member of the Australia men's national water polo team and represented the country at the 1992 Summer Olympics. His team finished fifth.

Coaching

McFadden has coached for the Australian Institute of Sport. After completing two years on scholarship at the AIS, he was appointed as a scholarship coach in 1990. He was an assistant coach to the AIS men's water polo team from 1992 to 1996. In 1996, he moved to Sydney to become the New South Wales Institute of Sport's Head Water Polo Coach, coaching both men's and women's squads. In 2001, McFadden moved back to Canberra to become AIS Men's Water Polo Head Coach. He held this position until 2004 when he was appointed assistant national women's coach. In 2005, he was appointed national women's coach taking over from Istvan Gorgenyi.

He was the head coach of the AIS's women's water polo team from 2005 to 2016.

McFadden was the head coach of the Australia women's national water polo team from 2005 to 2016. As head coach, he has helped make Australia one of the top three ranked teams in the world. He helped guide the 2006 national team to a first-place finish at the FINA World Cup. He helped the 2007 squad secure a silver medal finish at the World Championships in Melbourne. He impressed Steve Waugh with his requirements that national team players eat dinner at the table and eat everything on their plate.

On 13 August 2008, after his team drew 7–7 in a match against Hungary, he had a melt down at the media conference regarding the match officiating that saw Melissa Rippon removed from the game when Australia was ahead by a goal only for Hungary to tie things up by a goal in the remaining 16 seconds.  McFadden called the referee an arsehole and went on to say: "How's that a kick-out [exclusion] at the end of the game? We're up by a goal, we don't want to give away an exclusion, we foul the girl, we're trying to cut back. The Hungarian player has hold of us and we get excluded. That's just total bullshit as far as I'm concerned. I'd like to kill the bastard."

He was the coach when Australia's women won a bronze medal at the 2008 Summer Olympics. In 2012, he coached the team that competed at the Pan Pacific tournament.  He coached the team to an 8–7 win over the United States at the tournament. At the 2012 Summer Olympics he coached the team to the bronze medal.

Major competitions
Results of the Australian women's team coached by McFadden at major competitions:

Olympic Games
 2008 — 3rd place
 2012 — 3rd place
 2016 — 6th place

FINA World Championship
 2005 — 6th place
 2007 — 2nd place
 2009 — 6th place
 2011 — 5th place
 2013 — 2nd place
 2015 — 4th place

FINA World League
 2005 — 3rd place
 2006 — 4th place
 2007 — 2nd place
 2008 — 3rd place
 2009 — 3rd place
 2010 — 2nd place
 2011 — 3rd place
 2012 — 2nd place
 2014 — 3rd place
 2015 — 2nd place
 2016 — 3rd place

FINA World Cup
 2006 — 1st place
 2010 — 2nd place
 2014 — 2nd place

See also
 Australia women's Olympic water polo team records and statistics

References

External links

 

1964 births
Living people
Australian male water polo players
Olympic water polo players of Australia
Water polo players at the 1992 Summer Olympics
Australian Institute of Sport water polo players
Australian Institute of Sport coaches
Australian water polo coaches
Australia women's national water polo team coaches
Australian Olympic coaches
Water polo coaches at the 2008 Summer Olympics
Water polo coaches at the 2012 Summer Olympics
Water polo coaches at the 2016 Summer Olympics